Music can be used as a tool of psychological warfare. The term "music torture" is sometimes used to describe the practice. While it is acknowledged by United States interrogation experts to cause discomfort, it has also been characterized as having no "long-term effects".

Music and sound have been usually used as part of a combination of interrogation methods, today recognized by international bodies as amounting to torture. Attacking all senses without leaving any visible traces, they have formed the basis of the widely discussed torture in Guantanamo and Abu Ghraib. They were, however, devised much earlier in the 1950s and early 1960s, as a way to counter so-called Soviet "brainwashing". Methods of "noise torture" or "sound torture", which include the continuous playing of music or noise, have been paired with sensory deprivation, sleep deprivation, food and drink deprivation, and stress positions.

Instances of use

United States 
 A BBC News report claimed that "Enter Sandman" by the American heavy metal band Metallica, along with the children's television programs Barney the Dinosaur and Sesame Street, was used for sleep deprivation and to culturally offend Iraqi POWs.

 Claimed to being used by the United States 361st Psychological Operations Company by Sergeant Mark Hadsell:

 In the War on Terror, the US used the songs "The Real Slim Shady" by Eminem, the Meow Mix theme song, and "Fuck Your God" by Deicide to torture.
 When the United States invaded Panama in December 1989, Manuel Noriega took refuge in the Holy See’s embassy on December 24, which was immediately surrounded by U.S. troops. After being continually bombarded by hard rock music, including Van Halen's hit song "Panama", and The Howard Stern Show for several days, Noriega surrendered on January 3, 1990."

 According to the FBI:

"W[itness] observed sleep deprivation interviews w/strobe lights and loud music. Interrogator said it would take 4 days to break someone doing an interrogation 16 hrs w/lights and music on and 4 hrs off. Handwritten note next to typed synopsis says "ok under DoD policy".

"Rumors that interrogator bragged about doing lap dance on d[etainee], another about making d[etainee] listen to satanic black metal music for hours then dressing as a Priest and baptizing d[etainee] to save him - handwritten note says 'yes'."

"W[itness] saw d[etainee] in interview room sitting on floor w/Israeli flag draped around him, loud music and strobe lights. W suspects this practice is used by DOD DHS based on who he saw in the hallway."

 The Washington Post, quoting a leaked Red Cross report, wrote:

"The physical tactics noted by the Red Cross included placing detainees in extremely cold rooms with loud music blaring, and forcing them to kneel for long periods of time, the source familiar with the report said."

 The Hill, reporting on the #OccupyLafayettePark protests, wrote:
"A former adviser to Hillary Clinton hired a Mariachi band to play outside of the White House in an effort to disrupt President Trump's sleep on Wednesday night."

Iraq 
According to Amnesty International:

"Detainees have reported being routinely subjected to cruel, inhuman or degrading treatment during arrest and detention. Many have told Amnesty International that they were tortured and ill-treated by US and UK troops during interrogation. Methods often reported include prolonged sleep deprivation; beatings; prolonged restraint in painful positions, sometimes combined with exposure to loud music; prolonged hooding; and exposure to bright lights. Virtually none of the allegations of torture or ill-treatment has been adequately investigated by the authorities."

Israel 
On 12 January 1998 the Supreme Court of Israel declined to ban the use of loud music as an interrogation technique.

Greece 
According to recent research, the Greek military Junta (1967–1974) used the above-mentioned combination of interrogation techniques, including music. This took place in the headquarters of the Special Interrogation Unit of Greek Military Police (EAT/ESA), Athens. New interviews with survivors, held there in 1973, talk about the use of songs, popular hits of the time: these were played loudly and repeatedly from loudspeakers as the detainee had to stand without rest, food, drink or sleep.

South Korea 
South Korea has broadcast K-pop music across the Korean Demilitarized Zone (DMZ) into North Korea using loudspeakers. These operations were halted in 2018 following a thaw in inter-Korean relations.

New Zealand 
During 2022 Wellington protest, the Speaker House Trevor Mallard's used the Parliament speakers to play music such as Macarena by Los Del Rio and Barry Manilow's back catalogue.

Royalty payments

The Guardian reported that the US military may owe royalty payments to the artists whose works were played to the captives.

Musicians' protests

On 9 December 2008 the Associated Press reported that various musicians were coordinating their objections to the use of their music as a technique for softening up captives through an initiative called Zero dB.
Zero dB is an initiative against music torture set up by legal charity Reprieve, which represents over thirty prisoners in Guantanamo Bay. Zero dB aims to stop torture music by encouraging widespread condemnation of the practice and by calling on governments and the UN to uphold and enforce the Convention Against Torture and other relevant treaties. The initiative is backed by the Musicians Union which is calling on British musicians to voice their outrage against the use of music to torture.

Musicians and the wider public are making their own silent protests against music torture which are being shown on Zero dB. A series of silent protests and actions are planned through 2009. Participating musicians will include minutes of silence in their concerts to draw their audience's attention to the USA's use of deafening music against captives.

According to the Associated Press FBI agents stationed at Guantanamo Bay reported that the use of deafening music was common.
According to the Associated Press
Guantanamo Bay spokesmen Commander Pauline Storum: 

Among the musicians united in their objections were Christopher Cerf, a composer for the children's show Sesame Street, and Tom Morello
of Rage Against the Machine and Audioslave.
Others include Massive Attack, R.E.M., The Roots, Rise Against, Rosanne Cash, Pearl Jam, Bonnie Raitt, Trent Reznor, Billy Bragg, Michelle Branch, Jackson Browne, T-Bone Burnett, David Byrne, Marc Cohn, Steve Earle, Limp Bizkit, System of a Down, Disturbed, the Entrance Band, Skinny Puppy and Joe Henry.

The Associated Press reported that Stevie Benton of the group Drowning Pool commented: "I take it as an honor to think that perhaps our song could be used to quell another 9/11 attack or something like that." Benton later issued an apology, stating his comment had been "taken out of context".

See also
 Psychological torture
 Loud music
 High Anxiety
 Music and political warfare
 Gitmo playlist
 Psychic driving
 Acoustic harassment

References

Further reading 
 Moustafa Bayoumi. 'Disco Inferno.' The Nation 7 December 2005. Available at http://www.thenation.com/doc/20051226/bayoumi.
 Cusick, Suzanne. 'You are in a place that is out of the world . . .': Music in the Detention Camps of the 'Global War on Terror'. Journal of the Society for American Music 2/1 (2008): 1-26.
 Cusick, Suzanne. 'Music as torture / Music as weapon.' Revista Transcultural de Música/Transcultural Music Review 10 (2006). Available at https://web.archive.org/web/20070207092801/http://www.sibetrans.com/trans/trans10/cusick_eng.htm.
  
  
  
 M. J. Grant and Anna Papaeti (guest editors), the world of music (new series): Music and Torture | Music and Punishment vol. 2 no. 1 (2013).
 Anna Papaeti and M. J. Grant (guest editors), Torture: Journal on Rehabilitation of Torture Victims and Prevention of Torture: Special Thematic Issue ‘Music in Detention’ vol. 23 no.2 (2013). http://www.irct.org/media-and-resources/library/torture-journal/archive/volume-23--no.-2--2013.aspx
 Jon Ronson. The Men Who Stare at Goats. New York: Simon & Schuster, 2004.

Psychological torture techniques
Psychological warfare techniques
Psychological abuse
Perception
Music and politics
Music psychology